The 2023 European Youth Summer Olympic Festival will be the 17th edition of the European Youth Summer Olympic Festival, and will be held in Maribor, Slovenia, between 23 and 29 July 2023. The festival was originally supposed to take place in Koper. However, Maribor was confirmed as the new host city in June 2021.

Sports
The following competitions will take place:

Schedule
The competition schedule for the 2023 European Youth Olympic Summer Festival is as follows:

References

External links

European Youth Summer Olympic Festival
European Youth Summer Olympic Festival
Youth sport in Slovenia
Sport in Maribor
European Youth Summer Olympic Festival
European Youth Summer Olympic Festival
Youth Summer Olympic Festival
European Youth Summer Olympic Festival
European Youth Summer Olympic Festival